Sunusi Ibrahim (born 1 October 2002) is a Nigerian professional footballer who plays as a forward for Major League Soccer club CF Montréal.

Club career
Born in Keffi, Ibrahim was part of the youth system at FC Basira in Lafia before joining Nigerian Professional Football League side Nasarawa United. During the 2019 season, Ibrahim finished the season as the league's joint-top scorer, scoring 10 goals in 22 matches. He was also awarded the golden boot over joint-top scorer Mfon Udoh since Ibrahim was given one less caution during the season.

After the 2019 season, Ibrahim left Nasarawa United following the Federation Cup. In 2020, Ibrahim was part of 36 Lion Football Club in Lagos.

Montréal
On 12 January 2021, Ibrahim signed for Canadian Major League Soccer club CF Montréal.

International career
Following his performances during 2019 season, Ibrahim was called up to the Nigeria squad for the 2020 African Nations Championship qualifiers. He made his debut for his nation on 22 September 2019 against Togo, scoring the only goal for Nigeria in a 1–4 defeat.

In November 2019, Ibrahim was called up to the Nigeria under-23 side. He made his debut for them on 9 November 2019 during the 2019 African U-23 Cup of Nations qualifiers against the Ivory Coast.

Career statistics

Club

International

Scores and results list Nigeria's goal tally first.

References

2002 births
Living people
Nigerian footballers
Nigeria youth international footballers
Nigeria international footballers
Association football forwards
Nasarawa United F.C. players
CF Montréal players
Nigerian expatriate sportspeople in Canada
Nigerian expatriate footballers
Expatriate soccer players in Canada
Major League Soccer players
Montreal Impact U23 players
Première ligue de soccer du Québec players